Brian George Etheridge (4 March 1944 – 26 March 2011) was an English professional footballer and manager. He played in the Football League for Northampton Town and Brentford and later played in Belgium. He managed non-League clubs Corby Town, Wellingborough Town and Rushden Town.

Playing career

Northampton Town 
Etheridge began his career at hometown Fourth Division club Northampton Town. By the time he made his debut for the club during the 1962–63 season, the Cobblers had been promoted to the Third Division. Northampton's ascension to the Second Division at the end of that season further harmed Etheridge's first team chances, with his best appearance tally being 9 league games during the 1964–65 season. He departed the club in February 1966, having made just 17 league appearances and scored one goal during  seasons at the County Ground.

Brentford 
Etheridge joined Third Division club Brentford in February 1966 for a £8,000 fee and quickly won a place in the team. A poor 1965–66 season culminated in relegation to the Fourth Division, with Etheridge having made 16 appearances. Etheridge found himself in the reserve team during the 1966–67 season and made just eight first team appearances. He experienced some joy with the reserves and won the 1966–67 London Challenge Cup with the team. Etheridge departed the Bees at the end of the 1966–67 season, after making 24 appearances and scoring two goals during 18 months at Griffin Park.

Daring Club de Bruxelles 
During the 1967 off-season, Etheridge moved to Belgium to sign for First Division club Daring Club de Bruxelles, managed by Englishman Billy Elliott. He played in roughly half the club's matches and made 14 appearances and scored one goal during the 1967–68 season. He broke into the team in the following season and 28 appearances, scoring three goals and making appearances in Daring's 1968–69 Fairs Cup campaign. Despite European football, a disastrous season saw the club relegated to the Second Division. Etheridge departed Daring at the end of the campaign, after making 40 league appearances and scoring four goals for the club.

Cercle Brugge 
Etheridge transferred to Second Division club Cercle Brugge prior to the beginning of the 1969–70 season. In a one-season stay, he made 26 appearances and scored no goals.

Non-League football 
Etheridge returned to England in 1970 and joined Southern League Premier Division club Bedford Town. He failed to last with the club and dropped down to the Southern League First Division to sign for Corby Town in November 1970. He ended his playing career with Southern League club Wellingborough Town and United Counties League outfit Rushden Town.

Management career 
While at Corby Town, Wellingborough Town and Rushden Town, Etheridge combined his playing duties with that of managing each club.

International career 
While with Northampton Town, Etheridge won 18 caps for England Youth. He was joined in the team by fellow Cobblers graduates Tommy Robson, Jim Hall and Graham Carr.

Personal life 
Etheridge was married to Pauline and had two children. Etheridge's grandson, Tom Collins, is a rugby union winger and full back for Northampton Saints and was capped by England at U20 level . After leaving professional football, Etheridge became a businessman and was a partner in a packaging firm, based in Wales. Etheridge hanged himself at his home in March 2011, having suffered from depression and made several attempts on his life previously.

Career statistics

Honours 
Brentford
 London Challenge Cup: 1966–67

References

1944 births
2011 suicides
Footballers from Northampton
English footballers
English expatriate footballers
Association football midfielders
Northampton Town F.C. players
Brentford F.C. players
Cercle Brugge K.S.V. players
Bedford Town F.C. players
Wellingborough Town F.C. players
English Football League players
Belgian Pro League players
Expatriate footballers in Belgium
Suicides by hanging in England
Association football inside forwards
Corby Town F.C. players
Rushden Town F.C. players
Corby Town F.C. managers
Wellingborough Town F.C. managers
Rushden Town F.C. managers
English expatriate sportspeople in Belgium
Challenger Pro League players
Southern Football League players
Southern Football League managers
England youth international footballers
R. Daring Club Molenbeek players
People from West Northamptonshire District
English football managers